Nairne railway station is located in the Adelaide Hills town of Nairne, about 55 kilometres from Adelaide station.

History
Nairne station opened on 27 November 1883, as the interim terminus of the Adelaide-Wolseley line. The station's facilities were similar to that of Balhannah, except the station building was made of stone. Nairne had two platforms, the smaller one had a 45-metre platform with a small shelter.

The station closed on 31 December 1990 when the Adelaide-Mount Gambier passenger service ceased. The original station building and goods shed remain, but the smaller platform was demolished around 1994 during works to convert the line to standard gauge.

References

External links

Johnny's Pages gallery

Disused railway stations in South Australia
Railway stations in Australia opened in 1883
Railway stations closed in 1990